is a Japanese boxer who competed at the 2012 Summer Olympics in the flyweight division (– 52 kg). He is an alumnus of the Toyo University, and is Second lieutenant in the Japan Ground Self-Defense Force.

Susa took the bronze medal twice in the flyweight division at the Asian Games in 2006 and 2010. In July 2011, he won the gold medal in that division in the 21st President's Cup in Jakarta, Indonesia.

At the 2012 Summer Olympics, Susa competed in the Men's flyweight, but was defeated by the eventual gold medal winner Robeisy Ramírez in the first round.

See also 
2011 World Amateur Boxing Championships – Flyweight
2012 Asian Boxing Olympic Qualification Tournament

References

External links 
Katsuaki Susa's boxing stats International Boxing Association
Biography for Katsuaki Susa (until 2010) International Boxing Association
Katsuaki Susa Bio, Stats, and Results Sports-Reference.com

1984 births
Living people
Olympic boxers of Japan
Boxers at the 2012 Summer Olympics
Flyweight boxers
Toyo University alumni
Sportspeople from Fukushima Prefecture
Asian Games medalists in boxing
Boxers at the 2006 Asian Games
Boxers at the 2010 Asian Games
Japanese male boxers
Asian Games bronze medalists for Japan
Medalists at the 2006 Asian Games
Medalists at the 2010 Asian Games
21st-century Japanese people